Keiju Okada (Okada Keiju, born 2 December 1995) is a Japanese sailor. He competed in the men's 470 event at the 2020 Summer Olympics.

References

External links
 
 

1995 births
Living people
Japanese male sailors (sport)
Olympic sailors of Japan
Sailors at the 2020 Summer Olympics – 470
Sailors at the 2010 Asian Games
Sportspeople from Kitakyushu